Buellas is a commune in the Ain department in eastern France.

Geography
Buellas is located between the plain of Bresse and the plateau of Dombes. The Veyle forms the commune's northeastern border.

Population

Sights
 Parc botanique de la Teyssonnière, a botanical park

See also
Communes of the Ain department

References

External links

Official site
Gazetteer Entry

Communes of Ain
Ain communes articles needing translation from French Wikipedia